The Mobfathers is a 2016 Hong Kong crime film directed by Herman Yau, produced by and starring Chapman To. The film co-stars Gregory Wong and Philip Keung, with a guest appearance by Anthony Wong. The Mobfathers made its world premier at the 40th Hong Kong International Film Festival on 23 March 2016 and was theatrically released in Hong Kong on 31 March.

Synopsis
Every three years, the five leading gangs elect a representative to stand for election to be the Mobfather of the underworld. Each of the candidates has his strengths and his weaknesses, and there is understandably a decided lack of trust amongst the gangs. Each fighting for his gang's own vested interests. The Mobfather looks to two of his lieutenants to take over for him when he learns he is dying. In the end the two chosen candidates, Chuck and Wulf, killed each other in a gang fight. The movie ends with Chuck narrating how the Mobfather died.

Cast
Chapman To as Chuck
Gregory Wong as Wulf
Philip Keung as Luke
Anthony Wong as  Mobfather (guest appearance) 
Bonnie Sin as Chuck's wife
Carlos Chan as police
Danny Summer as uncle Sky
Lee Lung-kei as uncle Earth
Albert Cheung as uncle Man
Ken Hung as Wulf's men
Deep Ng as Coffee
Kenny Wong as Superintendent Xu
Tony Ho as Coke
Kathy Yuen as Mobfather's female companion & driver
Wylie Chu as General
Benson Ling as Chuck's men
Leander Lau as Chuck junior
Tarah Chan as Coco

Trailer
The first trailer was released by Golden Scene HK's YouTube channel on 3 March 2016.

References

External links

2016 films
2016 crime films
Hong Kong crime films
Triad films
2010s Cantonese-language films
Films directed by Herman Yau
Films set in Hong Kong
Films shot in Hong Kong
2010s Hong Kong films